The Mitten (Ukrainian: Рукавичка) is a Ukrainian fairy tale. It remains popular in modern Ukraine and has been translated into other languages.

Some of the written records of The Mitten date back to the 19th century and include the folklore collections of Pavlo Chubynsky. and Ivan Rudchenko.

Plot 

Considering numerous variations of the folk tale, the general story line is following: a man loses his mitten in a forest. One by one various animals come and settle in the mitten planning to spend cold winter in the warm mitten. Prior to settling, a new-comer asks permission from the animals already living there. Eventually, the mitten cannot hold all who want to warm themselves inside. It splits open and spills all the animals into the cold. The story illustrates the Tragedy of the Commons.

The range of animals also varies in different versions but generally includes in the most known and popular version: a mouse, a frog, a hare, a fox, a wolf, a boar and a bear. They have nicknames, for example: "Munchy the Mouse" and "Skippy the Frog". The animals arrive to the mitten in increasing order of their size.

Translations 
The Mitten was translated into various languages, including English, Japanese, Azerbaijani, French, German and Russian.
  
One of the most popular versions of The Mitten retold in English is by Jan Brett.

In popular culture 
In 1996 a Ukrainian Animated Film Studio Ukranimafilm released a cartoon The Mitten (N. Marchenkova, а scriptwriter and director).

In 2001 the Ukrainian government released a Ukrainian Fairy Tale series of stamps, including The Mitten.

References 

Ukrainian-language books
Ukrainian folklore
Fairy tales by country